Grace Methodist Episcopal Church may refer to: (sorted by state, then city/town)

 Grace United Methodist Church (Wilmington, Delaware), listed on the National Register of Historic Places (NRHP) in Wilmington, Delaware
 Grace Methodist Episcopal Church (Waterloo, Iowa), listed on the National Register of Historic Places (NRHP) in Black Hawk County
 Grace Methodist Episcopal Church (Wichita, Kansas), listed on the NRHP in Sedgwick County
 Grace Methodist Episcopal Church (Winfield, Kansas), listed on the NRHP in Cowley County
 Grace Methodist Episcopal Church (Newport, Kentucky)
 Grace Methodist Episcopal Church (Petoskey, Michigan), listed on the NRHP in Emmet County
 Grace Methodist Episcopal Church, Harrisburg, PA., the first church in the United States to use electric lights
 Grace Methodist Episcopal Church (Dallas, Texas), listed on the NRHP in Dallas County

See also
Methodist Episcopal Church